Jack Frederick Munns (born 18 November 1993) is an English professional footballer who plays as a midfielder for Hornchurch. He played in the Football League for Cheltenham Town.

Club career

Early career
After starting his footballing career with Leyton Orient, Munns joined Tottenham Hotspur at a young age. After failing to make a breakthrough at Tottenham, Munns joined League Two side Aldershot Town on a one-month loan deal. However, Munns failed to make an impression under manager Dean Holdsworth, and therefore returned to North London without a senior appearance to his name. On 30 June 2013, Munns was released at the end of his contract with Tottenham.

Preceding his release from Tottenham, Munns joined Championship side Charlton Athletic on a one-year deal. Following an impressive season playing for the Charlton Athletic youth sides, Munns was allocated the squad number 27, for the 2014–15 campaign. Although, Munns appeared on the Charlton bench several times, he failed to make his professional debut under managers Bob Peeters and Guy Luzon.

Cheltenham Town
On 11 May 2015, Munns joined National League side Cheltenham Town on a one-year deal. On 8 August 2015, Munns made his Cheltenham Town debut in a 1–1 draw against Lincoln City in the opening matchday of the season, scoring the opener within twenty-six minutes. On 3 October 2015, Munns went on to score a hat-trick in a 7–1 thrashing against FC Halifax Town, scoring in the 12th, 91st and 93rd minute. Munns went on to score four more goals in the 2015–16 campaign, as Cheltenham triumphed by winning promotion back into the Football League.

On 9 May 2017, it was announced that Munns would leave Cheltenham upon the expiry of his contract in June 2017.

Dagenham & Redbridge
On 6 September 2018, he signed for National League side and hometown club Dagenham & Redbridge on a deal until the end of the season, having been on trial. In May 2019, it was announced that he would be released following the expiration of his contract at the end of the 2018–19 campaign.

Dover Athletic
On 29 May 2019, Munns signed for Dover Athletic on a two-year deal active from 1 July 2019. Following's Dover's decision to not play any more matches in the 2020–21 season, made in late January, and subsequent null and voiding of all results, on 5 May 2021 it was announced that Munns was out of contract and had left the club.

Boreham Wood
In August 2021 he signed for National League side Boreham Wood, making his debut on 21 August in a 2–0 win at Weymouth.

Billericay Town
In November 2021 he dropped down a division to sign for National League South side Billericay Town, becoming new manager, Jody Brown's, first signing at the club.

Hornchurch
On 1 September 2022, Munns signed for Hornchurch.

Career statistics

Honours

Cheltenham Town
Vanarama National League: 2015–16

Billericay Town
Essex Senior Cup: 2021–22

References

External links

1993 births
Living people
Footballers from Dagenham
English footballers
Association football midfielders
Leyton Orient F.C. players
Tottenham Hotspur F.C. players
Aldershot Town F.C. players
Charlton Athletic F.C. players
Cheltenham Town F.C. players
Hartlepool United F.C. players
Dagenham & Redbridge F.C. players
Dover Athletic F.C. players
Boreham Wood F.C. players
Billericay Town F.C. players
Hornchurch F.C. players
National League (English football) players
English Football League players
England semi-pro international footballers